8-y km is a rural locality (a selo) under the administrative jurisdiction of the Settlement of Eldikan of Ust-Maysky District in the Sakha Republic, Russia, located  from Ust-Maya, the administrative center of the district, and, as the name suggests,  from Eldikan. Its population as of the 2010 Census was 0; down from 19 recorded in the 2002 Census.

References

Notes

Sources
Official website of the Sakha Republic. Registry of the Administrative-Territorial Divisions of the Sakha Republic. Ust-Maysky District. 

Rural localities in Ust-Maysky District